Onkar Nath (1904-1971) was an Indian politician. He was a Member of Parliament, representing Delhi in the Rajya Sabha, the upper house of India's Parliament as a member of the Indian National Congress .

References

Rajya Sabha members from Delhi
Indian National Congress politicians
1904 births
1971 deaths